Arnett Cobb Live is a live album by saxophonist Arnett Cobb which was recorded in Holland in 1982 and released on the Dutch Timeless label the following year.

Reception

The AllMusic review by Scott Yanow stated "The tenor always seemed on the verge of exploding and was still in prime form, as can be heard on four basic standards and his blues "Cobb's Idea." A lesser-known but rewarding effort, one of Cobb's best from his later years".

Track listing
 "Cobb's Idea" (Arnett Cobb) – 11:00
 "Sweet Georgia Brown" (Ben Bernie, Maceo Pinkard, Kenneth Casey) – 10:56
 "Just a Closer Walk with Thee" (Traditional) – 7:54
 "Body and Soul" (Johnny Green, Frank Eyton, Edward Heyman, Robert Sour) – 6:33
 "I Got Rhythm" (George Gershwin, Ira Gershwin) – 6:02
 Final Words by Arnett Cobb – 2:04

Personnel
Arnett Cobb – tenor saxophone
Rein de Graaff – piano
Jacques Schols – bass
John Engels – drums

References

Timeless Records live albums
Arnett Cobb live albums
1983 live albums